Jewett is a surname. Notable people with the surname include:

Charles Coffin Jewett (1816–1868), American librarian
Daniel Tarbox Jewett (1807-1906), U.S. Senator from Missouri
David Jewett (1772-1842), American naval officer and privateer, an instrumental figure in Argentina's claim to the Falkland Islands
Eliezer Jewett (1731-1817), founder and namesake of Jewett City, Connecticut
Ethel Jewett (1877–1944), American silent film actress
George Jewett (1870–1908), American athlete
Helen Jewett (1813-1836), New York City prostitute famous for having been murdered
Hugh Judge Jewett (1817-1898), U.S. Representative from Ohio
John P. Jewett (1814–1884), 19th century Boston book publisher
Joshua Jewett (1815–1861), U.S. Representative from Kentucky
Luther Jewett (1772–1860), U.S. Representative from Vermont
Mary Gregory Jewett (1908–1976), American historian and journalist
Milo Parker Jewett (1808–1882), college president
Nehemiah Jewett (1643–1720), colonial-era speaker of the Massachusetts House of Representatives
Pauline Jewett (1922–1992), Canadian Member of Parliament
Randolph Jewett (1602–1675), English organist
Sarah Orne Jewett (1849–1909), American author
Sophie Jewett (1861–1909), American poet and professor
Steve Jewett, American environmentalist
Willem Jewett (1963-2022), American lawyer and politician